Fanfare for the Comic Muse is the debut album by Irish chamber pop band the Divine Comedy, released in 1990 by Setanta Records. Recording took place at Homestead Studios in May 1990 with producer Sean O Neill. Lorcan Mac Loughlann engineered the sessions, and Mudd Wallace mixed the recordings.

The album has since been disowned by the band's lead singer/songwriter, Neil Hannon, due to its stylistic differences from the band's later works. "The Rise and Fall" was later re-recorded for the Timewatch EP (1991).

In 2020, the album was re-released for the first time as part of the 23-CD box set Venus, Folly, Cupid & Time - Thirty Years of the Divine Comedy. The tracks are featured on the second CD of the Juveneilia set, alongside remastered versions of the Timewatch and Europop EPs. On this reissue most of the tracks from Fanfare and Europop are damaged with glitches.

Track listing
All songs written by Neil Hannon.

Personnel
Personnel per booklet.

The Divine Comedy
 Neil Hannon – vocals, guitar
 John McCullagh – bass, backing vocals
 Kevin Traynor – drums, percussion

Production
 Sean O Neill – producer
 Lorcan Mac Loughlann – engineer
 Mudd Wallace – mixing

References

External links
 https://web.archive.org/web/20070928174934/http://eccentrick.co.uk/indulgence/dcbc.html

1990 debut albums
The Divine Comedy (band) albums
Setanta Records albums
Jangle pop albums